Conus adenensis is a species of sea snail, a marine gastropod mollusk, in the family Conidae, the cone snails and their allies.

References

 Tucker J.K. & Tenorio M.J. (2013) Illustrated catalog of the living cone shells. 517 pp. Wellington, Florida: MdM Publishing.

External links
 Smith E.A. (1891). On a collection of marine shells from Aden, with sorne remarks upon the relationship of the molluscan fauna of the Red Sea and the Mediterranean. Proceedings of the Zoological Society of London. (1891): 390-436, pl. 33.

adenensis
Gastropods described in 1891